Amity Law School may refer to the following schools in India:

Amity Law School, Delhi
Amity Law School, Kolkata
Amity Law School, Noida

See also
Amity University (disambiguation)